Udomsak Theinthong (born 23 March 1934) is a Thai former sports shooter. He competed at the 1968, 1972 and the 1984 Summer Olympics. He also competed at the 1970, 1974 and 1978 Asian Games.

References

1934 births
Living people
Udomsak Theinthong
Udomsak Theinthong
Shooters at the 1968 Summer Olympics
Shooters at the 1972 Summer Olympics
Shooters at the 1984 Summer Olympics
Place of birth missing (living people)
Asian Games medalists in shooting
Shooters at the 1970 Asian Games
Shooters at the 1974 Asian Games
Shooters at the 1978 Asian Games
Udomsak Theinthong
Medalists at the 1970 Asian Games
Udomsak Theinthong